Cnemaspis fantastica, the fantastic dwarf gecko, is a species of diurnal, rock-dwelling, insectivorous gecko endemic to  India.

The species name refers to its impressive colouration.

References

 Cnemaspis fantastica

fantastica
Reptiles of India
Reptiles described in 2022
Taxa named by Ishan Agarwal
Taxa named by Akshay Khandekar